Nuits Sonores is an electronic music festival based at Lyon in France. It usually occurs for five days in May.  It has been held since 2003.

Gallery

See also

List of electronic music festivals
Live electronic music
Nuits de Fourvière

References

External links 

 nuits-sonores.com

Lyon
Music festivals established in 2003
Electronic music festivals in France
2003 establishments in France